Hierotheus (died 1882) was Greek Orthodox Patriarch of Jerusalem (1875–1882).

1882 deaths
19th-century Greek Orthodox Patriarchs of Jerusalem